Alexander H. Homberger (26 October 1912 – 15 April 2007) was a Swiss rower who competed in the 1936 Summer Olympics in three boat classes.

He was born in Schaffhausen and died in Muskegon, Michigan, United States.

In 1936 he was a crew member of the Swiss boat that won the silver medal in the coxed four event. As part of the Swiss boat in the coxless four competition he won the bronze medal. He also participated in the eight event where the Swiss boat finished sixth.

References

External links
 
 
 CFMC Fall Newsletter

1912 births
2007 deaths
Swiss male rowers
Olympic rowers of Switzerland
Rowers at the 1936 Summer Olympics
Olympic silver medalists for Switzerland
Olympic bronze medalists for Switzerland
Olympic medalists in rowing
Medalists at the 1936 Summer Olympics
People from Schaffhausen
Sportspeople from the canton of Schaffhausen
European Rowing Championships medalists
Swiss emigrants to the United States